Kranenburg may refer to:

 Kranenburg, North Rhine-Westphalia, a municipality in the district Cleves, North Rhine-Westphalia, Germany
 Kranenburg, Lower Saxony, a municipality in the district Stade, Lower Saxony, Germany
 Kranenburg (Netherlands), a village in the municipality of Bronckhorst, Netherlands